Drevvatnet is a lake that lies in the municipality of Vefsn in Nordland county, Norway.  The village of Drevvassbygda lies at the northeastern end of the  lake, in the Drevjedalen valley.  The Nordland Line railway follows the southern coast of the lake.

Name
The first element is the name of the river Drevja and the last element is the finite form of vatn which means "lake".

See also
 List of lakes in Norway
 Geography of Norway

References

Lakes of Nordland
Vefsn